Rising Pune Supergiants (RPS) was a franchise cricket team based in Pune, Maharashtra, India, which played in the Indian Premier League (IPL) in 2016 and 2017. They were one of eight teams that competed in the 2016 Indian Premier League and were captained by Mahendra Singh Dhoni. This was their first season playing in the IPL.

Draft
Following the two-year suspension of Chennai Super Kings and Rajasthan Royals, two new franchises, Rising Pune Supergiants and Gujarat Lions, were established. These two franchises were allowed to draft a maximum of five players each from the Chennai and Rajasthan squads. The draft took place on 15 December 2015 and the following players were bought:

Players auction 

The player auction for the 2016 Indian Premier League was held in Bangalore on 6 February 2016. The team bought 20 players in the auction.

Standings

Squad 
 Players with international caps are listed in bold.

Results

References

Rising Pune Supergiants seasons
2016 Indian Premier League